Athena is a 7,365-foot-elevation (2,245 meter) mountain summit located within Olympic National Park in Jefferson County of Washington state. Athena is situated at the head of the Hoh Glacier, and the Hubert Glacier lies below the west aspect. Its neighbors include Mount Olympus,  to the northwest, and Aries  to the northeast.  Athena has subpeaks "Athena II" (7,259 ft), and "Athena's Owl" (7,000 ft). Precipitation runoff from the mountain drains into the Queets and Hoh Rivers, with Athena being the highest point within the Queets drainage basin.

History
This peak was originally called Mount Reid by the 1889-90 Seattle Press Expedition, in honor of Whitelaw Reid of the New-York Tribune. Reid was one of the expedition's sponsors. It is named for the goddess Athena, in keeping with the Greek mythology naming theme of features surrounding Mount Olympus. The peak is also known as the South Peak of Mount Olympus. The first ascent of the summit was made in 1938 by Don Dooley, George Martin, Bob Peterson, and Bob Scott.

Climate

Based on the Köppen climate classification, Athena is located in the marine west coast climate zone of western North America. Most weather fronts originate in the Pacific Ocean, and travel northeast toward the Olympic Mountains. As fronts approach, they are forced upward by the peaks of the Olympic Range, causing them to drop their moisture in the form of rain or snowfall (Orographic lift). As a result, the Olympics experience high precipitation, especially during the winter months. During winter months, weather is usually cloudy, but due to high pressure systems over the Pacific Ocean that intensify during summer months, there is often little or no cloud cover during the summer. The months July through September offer the most favorable weather for viewing or climbing this peak.

Geology

The Olympic Mountains are composed of obducted clastic wedge material and oceanic crust, primarily Eocene sandstone, turbidite, and basaltic oceanic crust. The mountains were sculpted during the Pleistocene era by erosion and glaciers advancing and retreating multiple times.

Gallery

See also

 Olympic Mountains
 Geology of the Pacific Northwest

References

External links
 
 Weather forecast: National Weather Service

Olympic Mountains
Mountains of Washington (state)
Mountains of Jefferson County, Washington
Landforms of Olympic National Park
North American 2000 m summits